Edward Mitchell "Mitch" Rouse (born August 6, 1964) is an American film and television actor, director, and screenwriter.

Rouse was born in Knoxville, Tennessee, and raised in Oak Ridge, Tennessee, where he played football at Oak Ridge High School.  He attended the University of Tennessee, then developed an interest in acting.

Career
Rouse studied acting in Atlanta and later, improvisation in Chicago, where he became involved with improv guru Del Close and Chicago's Second City Theatre where he met long-time friend David Pasquesi. After writing and performing in a number of Second City productions, Rouse moved to New York City.

Television
With Amy Sedaris, Paul Dinello, and Stephen Colbert, he co-created and starred in two television series for the cable television channel Comedy Central: Exit 57 and Strangers with Candy. Rouse has appeared on episodes of Reno 911!, Home Improvement, Still Standing, The Norm Show and Lost at Home. He appeared in seasons 4–6 of the sitcom According to Jim as Ryan Gibson, Dana's fiancee and later husband. Rouse also voiced Round John Virgin and Comet in the Holiday movie Olive, the Other Reindeer.

Rouse created and stars in Spike TV's 2008 comedy series Factory.

In 2013, Rouse played Eddie, the lead character in a single episode of the television series Call Me Crazy: A Five Film.

Film

Rouse appeared in several feature films, including Austin Powers, Friends with Money, Rudy,  and The Heartbreak Kid. His most prominent screen appearance as an actor was playing the leading role opposite Janeane Garofalo in 1997's Sweethearts. He directed and co-wrote the movie Employee of the Month starring Matt Dillon, Steve Zahn, Christina Applegate, and Andrea Bendewald as well as co-wrote Without A Paddle, starring Seth Green and Dax Shepard.

Personal life
In 2001, he married actress Andrea Bendewald in Malibu, California. The couple met while performing on the sitcom The Secret Lives of Men. Jennifer Aniston was the matron of honor at their wedding on August 19, 2001. He has two children, one son and one daughter.

References

External links

Mitch Rouse, Spike.com

1964 births
Living people
American male comedians
21st-century American comedians
American male film actors
American male screenwriters
American male television actors
American television directors
American television writers
People from Greater Los Angeles
People from Oak Ridge, Tennessee
Place of birth missing (living people)
American male television writers
Screenwriters from Tennessee
21st-century American screenwriters
21st-century American male writers